Elections were held in 2002 for both Senators and Deputies to the States of Jersey.

Senator Elections
 Philip Ozouf: 14442
 Wendy Kinnard: 12230
 Paul Routier: 11687
 Mike Vibert: 10624
 Len Norman: 10192
 Frank Walker: 9377
 Guy de Faye: 7576
 Terry McDonald: 7488
 Corrie Stein: 7303
 Geraint Jennings: 4667
 Chris Whitworth: 1982
 Adrian Walsh: 1846
 Robert Partridge: 1201

Psephological information
 Electorate: 46613
 Total Poll: 21056
 Spoilt Papers: 44
 Turnout: 45.2%

Deputy Elections

St Helier Number One District
Candidates (3 Elected)
 Patrick Ryan 720
 Judy Martin 660
 Jerry Dorey  488
 Peter Pearce 352
 Chris Whitworth 252
 Percentage Turnout 29.57%, Spoilt Papers: 0

St Helier Number two district
Candidates (3 Elected)
 Jennifer Bridge 785
 Terry Le Main 658
 Geoff Southern 609
 Ian McFirbishigh 577
 Percentage Turnout 32%, Spoilt Papers 5

St Helier Number three and four district
Candidates (4 Elected)
 Jacqui Hilton  1359
 Jacqui Huet 1289
 Ben Fox 1233
 Guy de Faye 1191
 Denise Carroll 793
 Imogen Nicholls 724
 Geraint Jennings 486
 Percentage Turnout 33.6%, Spoilt papers 15

St Saviour Number one district
Candidate (2 elected)
 Celia Scott Warren 531
 Robert Duhamel 519
 Kevin Lewis 374
 Bob Mason 240
 Percentage Turnout 39.36%, Spoilt Papers 10

St Saviour Number two district
Candidates (2 elected)
 Alan Breckon
 Lyndon Farnham
 Unopposed.

St Saviour Number three district
Candidates (1 elected)
 Roy Le Herissier 500
 Karen Stevens 104
 Percentage Turnout 33.3, Spoilt Papers 3

St Brelade Number one district
Candidates (One elected)
 Sarah Ferguson  489
 Alastair Layzell  455
 Percentage Turnout 48%, Spoilt Papers 5

St Brelade Number two district
Candidates (2 elected)
 Peter Troy 961
 Julian Bernstein 640
 Jane Wakeham 599
 Terry Coutanche 397
 Stefan Gough 193
 Robert Partridge 92
 Percentage Turnout 37.04%, Spoilt Papers 16

St Clement
Candidates (2 elected)
 Mike Taylor 1024
 Gerard Baudins 811
 Mike Stayte 561
 John Pirouet 425
 Michael Green 163
 Percentage Turnout 34.88%, Spoilt Papers 15

Grouville
Candidates (1 elected)
 Carolyn Labey 774
 Patricia Anne Picot 397
 Percentage Turnout 41%, Spoilt Papers 4

St John
Candidates (1 elected)
 Phil Rondel
 Unopposed

St Lawrence
Candidates (2 elected)
 Francis Gerald Voisin 877
 Maurice Dubras 743
 Deidre Mezbourian 550
 Peter Whorrall 66
 Percentage Turnout 42.75%, Spoilt Papers 0

St Martin
Candidates (1 elected)
 Bob Hill 729
 Christopher Blackstone 539
 Percentage Turnout 56.5%, Spoilt Papers 6

St Mary
Candidates (1 elected)
 Geoffrey Grime 300
 Juliet Gallichan 296
 Percentage Turnout 57.25%, Spoilt Papers 4

St Ouen
Candidates (1 elected)
 James Reed 598
 Jean Amy Le Maistre 340
 Terence Allan Picot 340
 Percentage Turnout 54%, Spoilt Papers 7

St Peter
Candidates (1 elected)
 Collin Egre 711
 Malcolm L'Amy 338
 Percentage Turnout 42.28%, Spoilt Papers 5

Trinity
Candidates (1 elected)
 Geoffrey Grime
 Unopposed

References

  2002 Jersey Senator Election results

General 2002
Jersey
General election